Jack Arnott is a Rugby Union player for Exeter Chiefs in the Aviva Premiership. He made his debut for the club against London Welsh on 28 January 2012. His position of choice is Winger. He has represented England U16, England U18 and is in the current England U20s Squad.

A former member of the Chiefs Academy, Arnott signed his first professional contract with Exeter on 25 May 2012.

Arnott is currently duel registered with Plymouth Albion in the RFU Championship to aid his player development.

Arnott scored a try within 10 seconds of coming on as a substitute on his debut in Exeter's opening game of the 2014/15 season against London Welsh.

References

External links
Exeter Player Profile
Plymouth Albion Player Profile
Premiership Rugby Profile

1993 births
Living people
Devonport Services R.F.C. players
Exeter Chiefs players
Rugby union players from Plymouth, Devon